Păltiniș (until 1960 Valea Boului) is a commune in Caraș-Severin County, western Romania with a population of 2353 people. It is composed of five villages: Cornuțel, Delinești, Ohabița, Păltiniș and Rugi. It is located in the historical region of Banat.

The earliest surviving mention of Păltiniș is in a document of 1585. The Roman fort of Caput Bubali is located in present-day Delinești village.

Landmarks
The Town Hall is in Păltiniș village, which is about 4.5 km away from the town of Caransebeș and about 40 km away from Reșița. Păltiniș has also a medical centre, veterinary centre, a school which has pupils from the 1st to the 8th grade. The Delinești mine is also located in the commune.

References

Communes in Caraș-Severin County
Localities in Romanian Banat